The Ministry of Justice is the Botswana ministry responsible for overseeing law enforcement. It was created by President Mokgweetsi Masisi in 2022 during a reorganization of the Cabinet of Botswana. Prior to this, the Ministry of Defence, Justice and Security served as the government's justice ministry.

Ministers of Justice 

 Machana Ronald Shamukuni (2022–present)

References 

Government ministries of Botswana
Justice ministries